"Angelina Baker", sometimes sung as "Angeline the Baker" (Roud 18341) is a song written by Stephen Foster for the Christy Minstrels, and published in 1850.  The original laments the loss of a woman slave, sent away by her owner.  The lyrics have been subjected to the folk process, and some versions have become examples of the "Ugly Girl" or "Dinah" song.

Music historian Ken Emerson noted that controversy over free and slave states, as well as Fugitive Slave Act of 1850, were hotly debated topics at the time of the song's composition. According to Emerson, Foster's lyrics obliquely acknowledge these controversies. Uncertain of the reception his blackface songs would receive, he temporarily abandoned the genre.

Fiddle tune
An instrumental version, as collected by John A. Lomax under the title "Angelina the Baker" is a popular fiddle or banjo tune, and differs from the Stephen Foster melody. It is part of the old time fiddle canon, but is also played by bluegrass musicians. This old-time tune was also played as bluegrass by  Stuart Duncan at the 2007 Delaware Valley Bluegrass Festival.

Lyrics
According to Lyle Lofgren, writing for Inside Bluegrass, publication of the Minnesota Bluegrass and Old-Time Music Association, "Foster published Angelina Baker in 1850, and it was featured on stage by the original Christy Minstrels." The melody and lyrics are as follows:

Notable performers
John Nicholas Hendershot and The Memphis Birdmen
Dry Branch Fire Squad
Crooked Still
The Norfolk Broads

References

External links

 
 "Hot Buttered Rum String Band Live at Four Seasons Hotel on 2005-08-28: Internet Archive". Accessed 2016-1-29.

1850 songs
Songs written by Stephen Foster
Blackface minstrel songs